Nazim (also spelled Nezim, Nadhem, Nadhim, Nathum or Nazem;  or ) is an Arabic masculine given name. The pronunciation of the Arabic letter Ẓāʾ is often closer to a strong "d" sound; thus, the name's pronunciation differs based on the spoken varieties of Arabic and consequently in its transcription.

The meaning of the name Nazim in Arabic is poet or author.

Nazim
Nazim Pasha, Chief of Staff of the Army of the Ottoman Empire during the First Balkan War
Nazim Burke, politician  from the island of Grenada
Nazim al-Kudsi (1906  – 1998), Syrian President
Nazim al-Qubrusi (1922- 2014), Cypriot-born leader of the Naqshbandi-Haqqani Sufi Order
Nazim Aliyev (born 1963), Azerbaijani footballer
Nâzım Hikmet Ran (1902 – 1963), Turkish poet, playwright, novelist and memoirist
Nazim Huseynov (born 1969), Azerbaijani judoka
Nazim Khaled, French songwriter and record producer
Nazim Panipati (1920 - 1998), lyricist, film writer and copywriter of Indian and Pakistani films
Nazim Shirazi, Bangaldesi-American cricketer
Nazim Hussain Siddiqui (born 1940), Chief Justice of the Supreme Court of Pakistan
Nazim Suleymanov (born 1965), Azerbaijani footballer

Nazım
Nazım Ekren (born 1956), Turkish politician
Nazım Sangaré, Turkish footballer

Nazem
Nazem Akkari (1902–1985), Lebanese politician
Nazem Ganjapour (born 1943), Iranian footballer
Nazem Al-Ghazali (1921–1963), Iraqi singer
Nazem al-Jaafari (born 1918), Syrian artist
Nazem Kadri (born 1990), Canadian ice hockey player
Nazem Sayadi, Lebanese footballer

Nazeem
Nazeem Bartman, South African footballer 
Nazeem Hussain, Australian comedian and actor

Nadhem
Nadhem Abdullah, Iraqi murdered during the Occupation of Iraq

Nadhim
Nadhim Kzar, administrator, politician, head of the Iraqi Directorate of General Security
Nadhim Shaker, Iraqi footballer
Nadhim Zahawi, British politician

Nadhum
Nadhum Shaker, Iraqi footballer and coach

See also
James Caan (entrepreneur), formerly Nazim Khan, (born 1960), Pakistani-British businessman

See also
Nazim, Pakistani title
Nazim (surname)
Nazim (disambiguation)
Nazimuddin (disambiguation)

References

Arabic-language surnames
Arabic masculine given names
Iranian masculine given names
Turkish masculine given names